Juan Carlos Loustau (born July 13, 1947) is a former Argentine football referee. He is known for supervising three matches at the 1990 FIFA World Cup in Italy. He refereed the Germany V Netherlands match in which he sent off Germany's Rudi Voeller and Netherlands' Frank Rijkaard after an ugly incident where Rijkaard spat at Voller. He also was the referee for the memorable 1990 FIFA World Cup Qualifier victory for the United States over Trinidad and Tobago and the match in which El Maracanazo took place. His son, Patricio, is now also a professional football referee.

References
 

1947 births
Argentine football referees
FIFA World Cup referees
1990 FIFA World Cup referees
Copa América referees
Living people
Place of birth missing (living people)